Bhawan Das is a Pakistani politician who had been a member of the National Assembly of Pakistan, from 2008 to May 2018.

Political career
He was elected to the National Assembly of Pakistan on a seat reserved for minorities as a candidate of Pakistan Muslim League (N) (PML-N) in the 2008 Pakistani general election.

He was re-elected to the National Assembly on a seat reserved for minorities as a candidate of PML-N in the 2013 Pakistani general election.

In April 2018, he quit PML-N and joined Pakistan Peoples Party.

References

Living people
Pakistani Hindus
Pakistan Muslim League (N) politicians
Pakistani MNAs 2008–2013
Pakistani MNAs 2013–2018
Year of birth missing (living people)